Marco Van Zyl Wentzel (born 6 May 1979 in George, Western Cape, South Africa) is a rugby union player. He plays as a lock or in the back-row.

He attended Outeniqua High School in George and played for their first team from 1995 to 1997; he was also captain in 1997. In 1996 and 1997, he played Craven Week for South Western Districts. He made his Currie Cup debut that year for SWD against North-West province.

In 2001, he played for a South Africa Under-23 side which won the Africa Cup and in 2002 he became a Springbok. He made his debut against  alongside Bakkies Botha and Jean de Villiers.

While at Treviso, they won the Copa Italia in 2004 and the Italian Super 10 in 2005 and 2006. He moved to England to represent Leicester Tigers and Leeds Carnegie in the Aviva Premiership, before plying his trade with London Wasps and joining teammate Steve Thompson at the Wycombe-based club in 2011.

He was released by the Sharks in November 2015.

References

External links
Leicester Tigers profile

1979 births
Living people
Leicester Tigers players
Wasps RFC players
Rugby union locks
South Africa international rugby union players
Pumas (Currie Cup) players
Bulls (rugby union) players
Lions (United Rugby Championship) players
Free State Cheetahs players
Sharks (rugby union) players
Sharks (Currie Cup) players
People from George, South Africa
Leeds Tykes players
Benetton Rugby players
South African expatriate rugby union players
Expatriate rugby union players in England
Expatriate rugby union players in Italy
South African expatriate sportspeople in England
South African expatriate sportspeople in Italy
Rugby union players from the Western Cape